Prodoxus marginatus is a moth of the family Prodoxidae. It is found in California, United States. The habitat consists of coastal chaparral and montane dry shrubby grassland.

The wingspan is 8–12 mm, making it the smallest Prodoxus species. In northern populations, the forewings are white with a dark patch near the outer edge in females, this is diffuse or absent in males. In southern populations, males usually have a gray streak parallel to the outer edge, while females have dark scaling on the forewings. The hindwings are uniformly light to medium gray.

The larvae feed on Yucca whipplei. They feed inside the basal vegetative portion of the fruit and may also be found into the adjacent pedicel portion. Pupation takes place inside the gallery.

References

Prodoxidae
Endemic fauna of California
Moths of North America
Fauna of the California chaparral and woodlands
Natural history of the Peninsular Ranges
Natural history of the Santa Monica Mountains
Natural history of the Transverse Ranges
Moths described in 1881
Fauna without expected TNC conservation status